Aigle Noir Makamba FC, is a football (soccer) club which was established in Makamba in 2009 and currently playing in the Burundi Premier League.

Current team

Management and staff

Honours
Burundi Premier League: 1
2019.

Burundian Cup: 1
2019.

Burundi Super Cup: 1
2019.

Coupe de l'Unité: 1
2020

Performance in CAF competitions
CAF Champions League: 1 appearance
2020 – Preliminary Round

CAF Confederation Cup: 0 appearance

External links
 Burundi League history (RSSSF)

References

Football clubs in Burundi
Association football clubs established in 2009
2009 establishments in Africa
Makamba Province